Hopetown or Hope Town may refer to:
Hopetown, Ontario, Canada
Hopetown, Northern Cape, South Africa
Hopeton, California, United States
Hopetown, Ohio, United States
Hopetown, British Columbia, a settlement of the Kwakwaka'wakw people in British Columbia
Hopetown Indian Reserve No 10A, an Indian Reserve located at Hopetown BC
Hope Town, a district of the Bahamas
Hope Town, Quebec, Canada
 Hopetown (album), a 2000 album by New Zealand singer-songwriter Dave Dobbyn

See also
 Hopeton (disambiguation)
 Hopetoun (disambiguation)
Hope Township (disambiguation)